Ezra Ichilov (10 June 1907 – 25 June 1961) was an Israeli politician who served as a member of the Knesset for the General Zionists and the Liberal Party between 1951 and 1961.

Biography
Ichilov was born in Petah Tikva during the Ottoman era. He was a member of Maccabi, and represented it at the nineteenth Zionist Congress. He was also a leader of Bnai Binyamin, an agricultural association, and in 1932 was elected to the central committee of Hitahdut HaIkarim. In 1928 he was amongst the founders of the Eretz Israel/Palestine Football Association.

Between 1931 and 1955 he was a member of Petah Tikva city council. In 1948 he joined the General Zionists, and was elected to the Knesset on the party's list in 1951. He was re-elected in 1955 and 1959, also representing the Liberal Party formed by the merger of the General Zionists and the Progressive Party. He died shortly before the 1961 elections at the age of 54.

Ichilov Hospital in Tel Aviv was named after his brother, Moshe.

External links

1907 births
1961 deaths
Jews in Mandatory Palestine
People from Petah Tikva
General Zionists politicians
Liberal Party (Israel) politicians
Members of the 2nd Knesset (1951–1955)
Members of the 3rd Knesset (1955–1959)
Members of the 4th Knesset (1959–1961)
Burials at Segula Cemetery